The Synagogue Church Of All Nations (SCOAN) is a  charismatic Christian megachurch located in Lagos, Nigeria.

History 
T. B. Joshua wrote that in a heavenly vision he received 'divine anointing' and a covenant from God to start his ministry in 1987. The church started with a handful of 8 members but has since become one of Nigeria’s most influential churches, attracting over 50,000 people to its weekly Sunday services at the headquarters in Ikotun-Egbe, Lagos. Joshua, the church's founder and senior Pastor died following services on June 5, 2021.

Religious tourism 
SCOAN is especially known for the huge number of foreign visitors it attracts with The Guardian reporting the church receives more weekly attendees than the combined number of visitors to Buckingham Palace and the Tower of London. This Day newspapers reported that “about two million local and inbound tourists” visit SCOAN annually.

It has been described as “Nigeria’s biggest tourist attraction” and “the most visited destination by religious tourists in West Africa”. Figures released by the Nigerian Immigration Service indicated that six out of every ten foreign travellers coming into Nigeria are bound for SCOAN.

SCOAN’s contribution to Nigeria's religious tourism was highlighted when the cleric hinted at the possibility of relocating his ministry to Israel during a Sunday service. The announcement proved controversial with several prominent Nigerians urging him to remain in the country, citing the economic setbacks Nigeria would likely experience through his potential relocation. The church's popular services have also resulted in an enormous boost for local businesses and hoteliers.

Faith healing 

SCOAN claims regular occurrences of divine miracles. It has published numerous videos claiming to document the healing of incurable disabilities and illnesses such as HIV/AIDS, blindness and open wounds.

Spiritual healing at SCOAN has been the subject of several media reports, including a mention in Time Magazine, an Associated Press interview and an article by Foreign Policy.

Television 
The church's weekly services are broadcast live on Emmanuel TV as well as on SCOAN's social media platforms. SCOAN is particularly popular on social media with 1.4 million YouTube subscribers and 3.5 million Facebook followers.

References

External links
 

Christian organizations based in Nigeria
Christianity in Lagos
Evangelical megachurches in Nigeria
Religious organizations based in Lagos
1987 establishments in Nigeria
Churches in Lagos
Pentecostal churches in Nigeria